Lewis A. "Lew" Fidler (May 27, 1956 – May 5, 2019) was a New York City Councilman. In January 2002, he began his first term representing the 46th district in New York City, which includes the Brooklyn neighborhoods of Bergen Beach, Canarsie, Georgetown, Flatlands, Marine Park, Mill Basin, Mill Island, Gerritsen Beach, Madison and Sheepshead Bay.

Career

City Council
During his time in the City Council, Fidler chaired of the Youth Services committee. He has also served as assistant majority leader under Speaker Christine Quinn. Fidler also served on the Education, Finance, Housing & Buildings, State & Federal Legislation, Veterans and Rules, Privileges & Elections committees. He was Democratic State Committeeman since 1992. In 2009, Fidler faced only token opposition from a Republican candidate whom he defeated with 79.2 percent of the vote. Fidler did not run for re-election in 2013 due to term limits; he was succeeded by fellow Democrat Alan Maisel on January 1, 2014.

Elections
In 1992 he was campaign manager for councilman Sal Albanese in a failed attempt to unseat congresswoman Susan Molinari in a year Democrats retook the White House. Additionally, Fidler served as campaign manager for the successful campaign of Brooklyn District Attorney Charles J. Hynes.

2012 State Senate special election
Fidler was the Democratic nominee for the New York State Senate special election being held on March 20, 2012. The district encompasses parts of Mill Basin, Bergen Beach, Sheepshead Bay, Manhattan Beach, Brighton Beach, Bensonhurst, and Midwood. He faced Republican lawyer David Storobin. The vote was exceedingly close and a final tally was still not finished or released by Friday, April 20, 2012.  On May 31, 2012 Lew Fidler conceded to Storobin following a full re-count, which Storobin led by 14 votes.

Personal life and death
Fidler attended PS 208, JHS 285 and Tilden High School. He received a B.A. from SUNY Albany in 1975, and a J.D. from NYU School of Law in 1978. He was admitted to the New York State Bar Association in 1979.

From 1983 to 2019, Fidler was a partner in the firm of Roberts and Fidler PC. He lived in his district with his wife, Robin and their two sons.

At 11 p.m. on May 4, 2019, Fidler was found unconscious at a theater in Queens, and was brought to Elmhurst Hospital Center. He died the following day after undergoing two surgeries, without ever regaining consciousness.

On November 9, 2021, Fidler was memorialized with the opening of Lew Fidler Park in Sheepshead Bay.

References

External links
 NYC Council: District 46 - Lewis A. Fidler
 Campaign website for the state senate
 Voting Record and Future Electoral Plans
 Fidler Takes 46th District (2010)
  Filder and the Thomas Jefferson Democratic Club in Brooklyn (2011) 

New York City Council members
New York (state) Democrats
Jewish American people in New York (state) politics
1956 births
2019 deaths
University at Albany, SUNY alumni
New York University School of Law alumni
People from Flatbush, Brooklyn
Lawyers from New York City
20th-century American lawyers
21st-century American Jews